The Solomon Islands participated in the 2010 Summer Youth Olympics in Singapore.

Athletics

Note: The athletes who do not have a "Q" next to their Qualification Rank advance to a non-medal ranking final.

Boys
Track and Road Events

Girls
Track and Road Events

Wrestling

Greco-Roman

References

Nations at the 2010 Summer Youth Olympics
2010 in Solomon Islands sport
Solomon Islands at the Youth Olympics